Block size can refer to:
Block (data storage), the size of a block in data storage and file systems.
Block size (cryptography), the minimal unit of data for block ciphers.
Block (telecommunications)
Block size (mathematics)
The size of a city block